Somerset Bridge is a small bridge in Bermuda connecting Somerset Island with the mainland in the western parish of Sandys, Somerset Bridge is reputedly the smallest working drawbridge in the world. It crosses a small channel connecting the Great Sound with Ely's Harbour.

The bridge is mentioned in the acts of Bermuda's first parliament, held in St. George's on 1 August 1620. Bridges were to be constructed at Somerset, the Flatts, and Coney Island. Additionally, the road from Somerset to Warwick was to be improved, and extended to Castle Point.  The bridge appears on a 1624 map of Bermuda.

The bridge is opened by hand, creating a 32-inch gap that allows the passage of a sailboat's mast. The drawbridge is depicted on a Bermudian banknote.

Notes 

Bridges in Bermuda
Bridges completed in 1620
Sandys Parish
1620 establishments in the British Empire
Bascule bridges